The Gift of Happiness Foundation (GOHF) is a charity under the Royal patronage of His Majesty King Bhumibol Adulyadej of Thailand that's dedicated to helping poor children in Bangkok and throughout Thailand.  The Gift of Happiness Foundation is a Registered Charity in the Kingdom of Thailand (Registration number: Kor Tor 1914)

Objective 
The Gift of Happiness Foundation serves happiness through giving simple slap-stick comedy shows and useful donations to people whose entire lives as innocent victims of fate, may be filled with only negative, abusive or unhappy experiences. We know that positive experiences, like having a good old-fashioned laugh, helps children living in difficult circumstances to cope and gives them a great memory that no-one can steal from them. Gift of Happiness Foundation also aim to distribute a wide range of donations at Orphanages, Crisis Centres for abused women and children, Bangkok slums, refugee camps along the Thai/Burmese border, HIV/AIDS centres, homes and schools for physically & mentally challenged children.

Donations 
The Gift of Happiness Foundation is funded purely by donations.  Donations have been collect from several organisations in Bangkok, including The St Georges Society, The Anglo-Thai Society

Video clips 
 Gift of Happiness YouTube channel

References

External links 
 Official Website

Children's charities based in Thailand
Organizations based in Bangkok
Organizations established in 2009
2009 establishments in Thailand